The following outline is provided as an overview of and topical guide to Tokelau:

Tokelau is a territory of New Zealand comprising three tropical coral atolls in the South Pacific Ocean.  The United Nations General Assembly includes Tokelau on the United Nations list of non-self-governing territories.

Until 1976 the official name was Tokelau Islands. Tokelau is sometimes referred to by Westerners by the older, colonial name of The Union Islands.

General reference 

 Pronunciation:
 Common English country name:  Tokelau (formerly Tokelau Islands)
 Official English country name:  The New Zealand Territory of Tokelau
 Common endonym(s): Tokelau
 Official endonym(s):  
 Adjectival(s): Tokelauan
 Demonym(s): Tokelauans
 Etymology: Name of Tokelau
 ISO country codes:  TK, TKL, 772
 ISO region codes:  See ISO 3166-2:TK
 Internet country code top-level domain:  .tk

Geography of Tokelau 

Geography of Tokelau
 Tokelau is: an overseas territory of New Zealand
 Location:
 Southern Hemisphere and Western Hemisphere
 Pacific Ocean
 South Pacific Ocean
 Oceania
 Polynesia
 Time zone:  UTC+13
 Extreme points of Tokelau
 High:  unnamed location 
 Low:  South Pacific Ocean 0 m
 Land boundaries:  none
 Coastline:  South Pacific Ocean 101 km
 Population of Tokelau: 1,400  - 219th most populous country

 Area of Tokelau: 10 km2
 Atlas of Tokelau

Environment of Tokelau 

 Climate of Tokelau
 Renewable energy in Tokelau
 Geology of Tokelau
 Protected areas of Tokelau
 Biosphere reserves in Tokelau
 Wildlife of Tokelau
 Fauna of Tokelau
 Birds of Tokelau
 Butterflies of Tokelau
 Mammals of Tokelau

Natural geographic features of Tokelau 
 The three atolls of Tokelau
 Atafu
 Fakaofo
 Nukunonu
 Islands of Tokelau
 World Heritage Sites in Tokelau: None

Populated places of Tokelau 
 List of villages in Tokelau

Demography of Tokelau 

Demographics of Tokelau

Government and politics of Tokelau 

Politics of Tokelau
 Form of government: parliamentary representative democratic dependency
 Capital of Tokelau: None, each atoll has its own administrative center
 Elections in Tokelau
 There are no political parties in Tokelau.

Branches of the government of Tokelau

Executive branch of the government of Tokelau 
 Head of state (ceremonial): King of New Zealand, King Charles III
 Head of government: Ulu-o-Tokelau
 Cabinet of Tokelau
 Council for the Ongoing Government of Tokelau

Legislative branch of the government of Tokelau 

 Parliament of Tokelau

Judicial branch of the government of Tokelau 
 Judiciary of Tokelau

Foreign relations of Tokelau 

Foreign relations of Tokelau
 Diplomatic missions in Tokelau
 Diplomatic missions of Tokelau

International organization membership 
Tokelau is a member of:
 The Pacific Community (SPC)
Pacific Islands Forum (PIF) (observer)
United Nations Educational, Scientific, and Cultural Organization (UNESCO) (associate)
Universal Postal Union (UPU)

Law and order in Tokelau 

Law of Tokelau
 Constitution of Tokelau
 Crime in Tokelau
 Human rights in Tokelau
 LGBT rights in Tokelau
 Freedom of religion in Tokelau
 Law enforcement in Tokelau

Local government in Tokelau 

Local government in Tokelau

History of Tokelau 

History of Tokelau
 Timeline of the history of Tokelau
 Constitutional history of Tokelau
 Military history of Tokelau

Culture of Tokelau 

Culture of Tokelau
 Architecture of Tokelau
 Cuisine of Tokelau
 Festivals in Tokelau
 Languages of Tokelau
 Tokelauan language
 Media in Tokelau
 Newspapers in Tokelau
 National symbols of Tokelau
 Coat of arms of Tokelau
 Flag of Tokelau
 National anthem of Tokelau
 People of Tokelau
 Public holidays in Tokelau
 Records of Tokelau
 Religion in Tokelau
 Tui Tokelau, a god worshipped in Tokelau
 World Heritage Sites in Tokelau: None

Art in Tokelau 
 Art in Tokelau
 Literature of Tokelau
 Music of Tokelau
 Television in Tokelau
 Theatre in Tokelau

Sports in Tokelau 
 Rugby league in Tokelau
 Rugby union in Tokelau

Economy and infrastructure of Tokelau 

Economy of Tokelau
 Economic rank, by nominal GDP (2007):
 Agriculture in Tokelau
 Banking in Tokelau
 Communications in Tokelau
 Internet in Tokelau
 Companies of Tokelau
Currency of Tokelau: Dollar
ISO 4217: NZD
 Energy in Tokelau
 Energy policy of Tokelau
 Health care in Tokelau
 Tourism in Tokelau
 Luana Liki Hotel
 Transport in Tokelau
 Water supply and sanitation in Tokelau

Education in Tokelau 

Education in Tokelau
 Literacy in Tokelau

See also 

Index of Tokelau-related articles
List of international rankings
Outline of geography
Outline of New Zealand
Outline of Oceania

References

External links 

Ethnology of Tokelau Islands
History, culture, and economy of Tokelau
Tokelau Council of Ongoing Government, executive branch of the government
The Administrator of Tokelau, Tokelau website of the NZ Ministry of Foreign Affairs and Trade
CIA World Factbook entry for Tokelau

'Tokelau wonders, "What have we done wrong?"'
Tokelau travel guide at Wikivoyage

 Atoll links
Fakaofo
Nukunonu

Tokelau
 1